Parampara is a 1993 Indian Hindi-language action romantic drama film starring Sunil Dutt, Vinod Khanna, Aamir Khan, Saif Ali Khan, Neelam Kothari, Raveena Tandon, Ashwini Bhave, Ramya Krishna and Anupam Kher. The film is produced by Firoz A. Nadiadwala and directed by Yash Chopra. Aditya Chopra wrote the screenplay for the film. The film was supposed to be Saif Ali Khan's debut and was released with high expectations but was a commercial failure, critically panned for its storyline, performances and music. However, critics praised the direction by Yash Chopra. The movie is set in the famous Indian boarding school, Mayo College.

Plot

The wealthy Thakur Bhavani Singh lives in a remote region of India where he shares an intense rivalry with a local gypsy clan led by Gora Shankar. Parampara (tradition) dictates that differences are resolved with a single bullet pistol duel at the top of a hill. Years earlier, Bhavani Singh fought a duel against Gora Shankar's father and killed him.

Bhavani's son Prithvi returns from London and strikes up a friendship with Shankar and his clanmates, much to the dismay of his father. As Prithvi gets closer he falls in love with Shankar's sister Tara. His father, however, has arranged Prithvi's marriage with the daughter of a fellow upper-class acquaintance. Prithvi is unable to make up his mind and ends up defiantly marrying Tara against his father's wishes - and subsequently marrying the girl of his father's choosing, Rajeshwari.

Later, Bhavani Singh discovers Tara has given birth to Prithvi's son and to his fury, orders his men to attack the gypsy colony and to kill Tara, her son and anyone who comes in the way. The Thakur's men set the camps ablaze, killing Tara but not her son, Ranvir. Shankar, who also survived the attack storms in to kill Bhavani Singh in revenge but he is arrested and imprisoned. Prithvi, tells his father that he will never acknowledge his presence again and despite living in the same house, his father will never hear his voice. Rajeshwari then presents him with the rescued Ranvir, earning the respect and love of her husband. Rajeshwari gives birth to a son Pratap, whom Bhavani Singh recognises as his true grandson. Both Ranvir and Pratap are brought up in the same household by Prithvi and Rajeshwari but both boys eventually realise that there is a difference between the two.

Gora Shankar is released from prison and returns to challenge Bhavani Singh to a pistol duel, but before the old man can respond, Prithvi intervenes and says the duel should be fought among equals and that Shankar should be duelling him, not his father. Shankar, who still sees Prithvi as his friend, reluctantly accepts and the duel is set for the next day.

Prithvi silently takes his father's blessing and heads to the hill alone. At the duel, both Shankar and Prithvi take their pistols and begin to pace away from each other. As the shot to turn and fire is heard, both men turn and aim - but only Shankar fires, shooting Prithvi in the chest. He runs immediately to Prithvi who reveals he never loaded his gun. As Prithvi dies, he tells Shankar to take Ranvir far away from his father, hoping no more blood will be shed in petty rivalry. At Prithvi's funeral, both Bhavani Singh and Gora Shankar draw their swords and challenge each other but are stopped by Rajeshwari. Shankar takes Ranvir and leaves the region for good.

Years later, both of Prithvi's sons meet in college as strangers, not knowing the identity of the other. Firstly rivals, the two become close friends but after Pratap recognises Gora Shankar at Ranvir's house, the two quickly realise that their past is linked but after years of being influenced by their respective guardians, they share a hatred of one another's families. Ranvir blames Bhavani Singh for killing his mother, while Pratap blames Shankar for killing his father.

Despite the efforts of Shankar and Rajeshwari to end the fighting which will only lead to tragedy, Ranvir ends up challenging his grandfather Bhanvi Singh to a duel. Pratap, echoing the words of his father years ago, states that the duel should be fought among equals and with that the challenge is set.

The next day Pratap arrives with Rajeshwari and Ranvir with Shankar. Just as the battle is about to start, Bhavani shows up on his horse to watch from a distance. The two brothers turn their back to each other and start to pace away. As they do this their grandfather watches them and begins to see visions of his son Prithvi as he looks at both Ranvir and Pratap. The signal to turn and shoot is given and both men turn and fire instinctively - only to see their grandfather between them having taken both their bullets. As Bhavani stumbles to the ground, he cries out for Prithvi, revealing the years of the torment of losing his son. The brothers rush to the fallen old man who in his last moments tells them of his regret and hope that with his death there is no further bloodshed.

After the funeral, Ranvir and Pratap are about to head their separate ways but stop to embrace each other as brothers for the first time.

Cast 
 Sunil Dutt as Thakur Bhavani Singh
 Vinod Khanna as Prithvi Singh
 Aamir Khan as Ranvir Prithvi Singh
 Saif Ali Khan as Pratap Singh
 Neelam Kothari as Sapna
 Raveena Tandon as Vijaya
 Ashwini Bhave as Rajeshwari Singh
 Ramya Krishna as Tara Shankar
 Anupam Kher as Gora Shankar
 Aloka Mukherjee as Phulmati Shankar
 Vikas Anand as a Qawal Singer
 Mukesh Rishi as Thakur Bhavani Singh's Man

Soundtrack
The music is done by Shiv-Hari.

References

External links 
 

1990s Hindi-language films
Films directed by Yash Chopra
Films scored by Shiv-Hari
Films shot in Switzerland
1993 romantic drama films
1993 films
Indian romantic drama films